Francine Allard (born October 16, 1949) is a Quebec educator, novelist, poet, and visual artist.

She was born in Verdun, Quebec and was educated at the Université du Québec à Montréal and the Institut Pédagogique Marguerite Bourgeoys in Westmount. She also studied at the Conservatoire de musique et d'art dramatique du Québec.

Allard served as secretary-treasurer of the Union des écrivaines et des écrivains québécois and as president of the Association des écrivains québécois pour la jeunesse. She helped establish the Prix Cécile Gagnon to encourage the development of literature for young people. She has contributed to various literary magazines such as CV2, Moebius, Brèves, Art le Sabord and Nuit Blanche.

Selected works 
 Ma Belle Pitoune en or, novel (1993)
 Le Mal mystérieux de la salamandre à quatre orteils, young adult novel (1995)
 Babyboom blues, stories (1997)
 Deux Petits Ours au milieu de la tornade, young adult novel (1999)
 Les Mains si blanches de Pye Chang, novel (2000)
 Le Cri du silence, novel (2002)
 Ambroise, bric-à-brac, young adult novel (2004)
 Au bout du quai, poetry (2008)
 La couturière: Les aiguilles du temps (2008), La vengeance de la veuve noire (2009), La persistance du romarin (2010), trilogy
 L'âme inconsciente du pétoncle, poetry (2012)

References 

1949 births
Living people
Canadian poets in French
Canadian novelists in French
20th-century Canadian poets
20th-century Canadian novelists
21st-century Canadian poets
Canadian short story writers in French
Canadian women novelists
Canadian women poets
Canadian women short story writers
Canadian writers of young adult literature
People from Verdun, Quebec
Women writers of young adult literature
Writers from Montreal
20th-century Canadian women writers
21st-century Canadian women writers
20th-century Canadian short story writers
21st-century Canadian short story writers